European Parliament elections were held in France on 13 June 2004. The opposition Socialist Party made substantial gains, although this was mainly at the expense of minor parties. The governing Union for a Popular Movement and Union for French Democracy also made gains.

Seats
The elections were conducted in seven regional constituencies in metropolitan France, plus an eighth consisting of all overseas departments and territories. Allocation of seats was by proportional representation, with closed lists and no preferential voting, using the rule of the highest average, with a threshold of 5% of the votes in each.

Results

Members elected

Nord-Ouest
Jean-Louis Bourlanges (Alliance of Liberals and Democrats for Europe)
Jean-Louis Cottigny (Party of European Socialists)
Brigitte Douay (Party of European Socialists)
Hélène Flautre (Greens-EFA)
Jean-Paul Gauzes (European People's Party)
Jacky Henin (European United Left - Nordic Green Left)
Carl Lang (Non-Inscrits)
Marie-Noëlle Lienemann (Party of European Socialists)
Vincent Peillon (Party of European Socialists)
Tokia Saïfi (European People's Party)
Chantal Simonot (Non-Inscrits)
Henri Weber (Party of European Socialists)

Ouest
Marie-Hélène Aubert (Greens-EFA)
Roselyne Bachelot-Narquin (European People's Party)
Philippe de Villiers (Independence and Democracy)
Ambroise Guellec (European People's Party)
Stéphane Le Foll (Party of European Socialists)
Philippe Morillon (Alliance of Liberals and Democrats for Europe)
Bernard Poignant (Party of European Socialists)
Marie-Line Reynaud (Party of European Socialists)
Yannick Vaugrenard (Party of European Socialists)
Bernadette Vergnaud (Party of European Socialists)

Est
Jean Marie Beaupuy (Alliance of Liberals and Democrats for Europe)
Joseph Daul (European People's Party)
Bruno Gollnisch (Non-Inscrits)
Natalie Griesbeck (Alliance of Liberals and Democrats for Europe)
Benoît Hamon (Party of European Socialists)
Adeline Hazan (Party of European Socialists)
Marie-Anne Isler-Béguin (Greens-EFA)
Véronique Mathieu (European People's Party)
Pierre Moscovici (Party of European Socialists)
Catherine Trautmann (Party of European Socialists)

Sud-Ouest
Kader Arif (Party of European Socialists)
Françoise Castex (Party of European Socialists)
Jean-Marie Cavada (Alliance of Liberals and Democrats for Europe)
Christine de Veyrac (European People's Party)
Alain Lamassoure (European People's Party)
Anne Laperrouze (Alliance of Liberals and Democrats for Europe)
Jean-Claude Martinez (Non-Inscrits)
Robert Navarro (Party of European Socialists)
Gérard Onesta (Greens-EFA)
Béatrice Patrie (Party of European Socialists)

Sud-Est
Jean-Luc Bennahmias (Greens-EFA)
Guy Bono (Party of European Socialists)
Marie-Arlette Carlotti (Party of European Socialists)
Thierry Cornillet (Alliance of Liberals and Democrats for Europe)
Claire Gibault (Alliance of Liberals and Democrats for Europe)
Françoise Grossetête (European People's Party)
Jean-Marie Le Pen (Non-Inscrits)
Patrick Louis (Independence and Democracy)
Michel Rocard (Party of European Socialists)
Martine Roure (Party of European Socialists)
Lydia Schenardi (Non-Inscrits)
Ari Vatanen (European People's Party)
Dominique Vlasto (European People's Party)

Massif-Central – Centre
Bernadette Bourzai (Party of European Socialists)
Marie-Hélène Descamps (European People's Party)
Janelly Fourtou (Alliance of Liberals and Democrats for Europe)
Catherine Guy-Quint (Party of European Socialists)
Brice Hortefeux (European People's Party)
André Laignel (Party of European Socialists)

Île-de-France
Pervenche Berès (Party of European Socialists)
Paul-Marie Coûteaux (Independence and Democracy)
Marielle de Sarnez (Alliance of Liberals and Democrats for Europe)
Harlem Désir (Party of European Socialists)
Anne Ferreira (Party of European Socialists)
Nicole Fontaine (European People's Party)
Patrick Gaubert (European People's Party)
Marine Le Pen (Non-Inscrits)
Bernard Lehideux (Alliance of Liberals and Democrats for Europe)
Alain Lipietz (Greens-EFA)
Gilles Savary (Party of European Socialists)
Pierre Schapira (Party of European Socialists)
Jacques Toubon (European People's Party)
Francis Wurtz (European United Left - Nordic Green Left)

Outre-mer
Jean-Claude Fruteau (Party of European Socialists)
Margie Sudre (European People's Party)
Paul Vergès (European United Left - Nordic Green Left)

France
European Parliament elections in France
Europe
European Parliament election